Horry County Schools (HCS) is a public school district serving Horry County, South Carolina and is the third-largest school district in South Carolina. It serves over 45,000 students (as of the 2018–19 school year) in 56 schools (as well as offering additional education programs). The district office is located in Conway, South Carolina.

The district is made up of nine attendance areas: Aynor, Carolina Forest, Conway, Green Sea Floyds, Loris, Myrtle Beach, North Myrtle Beach, Socastee, and St. James.

Each area consists of a high school and the elementary and middle schools that feed into it. The district has 27 schools serving pre-kindergarten through fifth grades, 13 middle schools, 9 high schools, 3 career and technical academies, a Scholars Academy, and four charter schools. Two of the high schools, Aynor High School and Socastee High School, offer International Baccalaureate programs. 
The career and technical academies are: Academy for Arts, Sciences and Technology; Palmetto Academy for Learning Motor Sports, and the Academy for Technology and Academics. The Palmetto Academy for Learning Motor Sports (a charter school) serves middle and high school students while the remaining two serve high school students. The Scholars Academy serves high-achieving students in grades 9-12. The HCS Early College High School targets students in grades 9-12 who are under-represented in post-secondary education, and allows them to achieve two years of college credit while also earning a high school diploma. The district also has the Playcard Environmental Education Center which "instruct[s] students in the natural sciences on site, enabling them to experience first-hand the inter-relationships of living things." The Adult Education Center has a variety of educational opportunities for adults. These range from GED classes to career and college transition, community classes, English as Second Language classes, and community classes. The community classes are: computer literacy classes, arts & crafts classes, Spanish, CPR/AED certification, and Tai Chi for arthritis/health. The Adult Education Center also provides free child care and early education for children of parents attending classes at the Adult Education Center. In addition to these programs, students from seventh grade up may also take classes via either the HCS Virtual School Program or the South Carolina Virtual School Program.

A twelve-member Board of Education, elected from single-member districts, governs the school district, with the chairman being elected at-large. The Superintendent is appointed by the Board. Board meetings are generally held on the last Monday of the month and work sessions held on the 2nd Monday of the month though the district calendar contains an accurate listing of all board meetings. Normal board meetings are open to the public and agendas, minutes, and video of the meetings are available through the school district's website.

The HCS Mobile app was introduced in 2018. The app is available for iOS and Android operating systems and as a web/html5 based app.

Schools

Elementary schools
Aynor Elementary School
Burgess Elementary School
Carolina Forest Elementary School
Conway Elementary School
Daisy Elementary School
Forestbrook Elementary School
Green Sea Floyds Elementary School
Homewood Elementary School
Kingston Elementary School
Lakewood Elementary School
Loris Elementary School
Midland Elementary School
Myrtle Beach Elementary School
Myrtle Beach Early Childhood School
Myrtle Beach Primary School
Ocean Bay Elementary School
Ocean Drive Elementary School
Palmetto Bays Elementary School
Pee Dee Elementary School
River Oaks Elementary School
Riverside Elementary School
Seaside  Elementary School
Socastee Elementary School
South Conway Elementary School
St. James Elementary School
St. James Intermediate School
Waterway Elementary School

Middle schools
Aynor Middle School
Black Water Middle School
Conway Middle School
Forestbrook Middle School
Green Sea Floyds Middle School
Loris Middle School
Myrtle Beach Middle School
North Myrtle Beach Middle School
Ocean Bay Middle School
Socastee Middle School
St. James Middle School
Ten Oaks Middle School
Whittemore Park Middle School

Base high schools and high school options 
 Academy for Technology & Academics
 Academy for Arts, Science & Technology
 Aynor High School
 Carolina Forest High School
 Conway High School
 HCS Early College High School
 Green Sea Floyds High School
 Loris High School
 Myrtle Beach High School
 North Myrtle Beach High School
 Scholars Academy
 Socastee High School
 St. James High School

Program Schools 
 HCS Virtual School
 Horry County Adult Education
 Playcard Environmental Education Center 
 Therapeutic Learning Center
 Soar Academy

Charter schools 
 Bridgewater Academy
 Palmetto Academy
 Academy of Hope
 Palmetto Academy for Learning Motor Sports
Coastal Leadership Academy

References

External links
 Horry County Schools Official Site

Education in Horry County, South Carolina